Tim Broad was a British film director, best known for his music videos for the singer Morrissey.

In a 1990 interview, he was described as Morrissey's closest friend. Broad directed the video for The Smiths' songs "Girlfriend in a Coma" and "Stop Me If You Think You've Heard This One Before", and subsequently a number of videos for Morrissey, seven of which were released on the compilation Hulmerist.

He also directed the videos for the Mike + The Mechanics' songs "The Living Years" and "Nobody Knows", Marc Almond's "Tears Run Rings" and several songs by The Jesus and Mary Chain.

Broad died of an HIV-related illness in 1993 at the age of 38.

Filmography: Music videos for Morrissey
 Suedehead (1988)
 Everyday Is Like Sunday (1988)
 The Last of the Famous International Playboys (1989)
 Interesting Drug (1989)
 Ouija Board, Ouija Board (1989)
 November Spawned a Monster (1990)
 Sing Your Life (1990)
 Pregnant for the Last Time (1991)
 My Love Life (1991)
 We Hate It When Our Friends Become Successful (1992)
 You're the One for Me, Fatty (1992)

References 

Year of birth missing
1992 deaths
British music video directors
AIDS-related deaths in the United Kingdom